Wilhelm "Willi" Fuggerer (11 September 1941 – 2 September 2015) was a German track cyclist. He competed at the 1964 Olympics in the 2000 m tandem and 1000 m sprint and finished in third and fifth place, respectively. In the tandem semifinals he and Klaus Kobusch apparently won 2:1 against the Italian team, but were disqualified in the third race for moving out of their lane in the final sprint.

References

External links

 

1941 births
2015 deaths
German male cyclists
Olympic bronze medalists for the United Team of Germany
Cyclists at the 1964 Summer Olympics
Olympic cyclists of the United Team of Germany
Olympic medalists in cycling
Sportspeople from Nuremberg
Medalists at the 1964 Summer Olympics
Cyclists from Bavaria
20th-century German people
21st-century German people